is a former Japanese football player.

Playing career
Shigehara was born in Tatebayashi on October 6, 1981. After graduating from high school, he joined J1 League club Vissel Kobe in 2000. He got opportunity to play as midfielder from first season. In 2002, he moved to J2 League club Kawasaki Frontale. He became a regular player as defensive midfielder and played many matches in 2 seasons. In 2004, he moved to J1 club Kashiwa Reysol. Although he played many matches, he could not become a regular player. In 2005, he moved to J1 club Sanfrecce Hiroshima. He became a regular player as right midfielder. In 2006, he moved to J1 club Kawasaki Frontale again. Although he played as substitute midfielder in March, he was arrested on March 20 and he was sacked on March 31. In July 2006, he joined J1 club Ventforet Kofu. He played many matches as center forward and left wing. However the club was relegated to J2 end of 2007 season. In 2008, he moved to Kashiwa Reysol again. He played as regular left midfielder until April. However he was arrested in April in the case of 2001 and he was sacked in May.

Club statistics

References

External links

1981 births
Living people
Association football people from Gunma Prefecture
Japanese footballers
J1 League players
J2 League players
Vissel Kobe players
Kawasaki Frontale players
Kashiwa Reysol players
Sanfrecce Hiroshima players
Ventforet Kofu players
Association football midfielders